Kattrup is a manor house and estate located south of Jyderyp,  Kalundborg Municipality, 90 kilometres west of Copenhagen, Denmark.

History

Early history
Kattrup was in the Middle Ages, a manor located in a village by the same name. In 1339, Queen Margrethe I gave it to Sorø Abbey. In 1444 , Sorø Abbey ceded it to the Diocese of Roskilde in exchange for other property. The estate was confiscated by the Crown after the Reformation, In 1561,it was ceded to Laurits Iversen Serlin in exchange for other property.

In the late 16th century, Kattrup was acquired by Rasmus Skade through his marriage to the previous owner's daughter Kirsten. After his death in 1602 it was passed on to his son Christoffer Skade. His heirs sold Kattrup  to Axel Juul of Volstrup.

In 1664,Kattrup was acquired by Treasurer Henrik Müller, He would later become one of the largest landowners in the country. In the 1680s, he passed Kattrup on to his son Christian Müller who in 1689 ceded it to his brother Frantz Müller. Frantz Müller died in 1705. Kattrup was then sold at auction to Christian Paludan. It was later sold first to Bolle Luxdorph Rose and then in 1718 to Hans Philip Bochenhoffer. Bochenhoffer was in debt to Marie Juul of Kragerupgaard and he ended up ceding the ownership of the estate to her. In 1742, she ceded the estate to her son-in-law Anton Günther Ellbrecht.

In  1751, Kattrup was acquired by district judge Peder Kraft. His widow sold it to Jørgen v. Hjelmcrone. He ran into economic difficulties and had to sell the estate in 1775. The new owner was Major H. Focken.

The Mylius family
 
In  1800, Kattrup was acquired by Johan Caspar Mylius. He left Kattrup in the hands of his mother, Ulrika Cathrine de Mylius, after having purchased Estruplund  and a number of other estates. She was also the owner of Rønninge Søgård on Funen. Mylius reacquired Kattrup after her death in 1831. He sold the estate to J.F. Adeler in 1835 but reacquired it when Adeler  went bankrupt the following year.

After Mylius' death in 1852, Kattrup was passed on to his son-in-law, Frederik Emil Herman Bernstorff. He was succeeded by his son Ulrich Bernstorff-Mylius. He demolished the old main building in 1896 and constructed a new one in 1925. After his death in 1930, Kattrup was passed on to his son Andreas Peter Bernstorff-Mylius.

The Møller family
Arnold Peter Møller, the founder of A.P. Møller - Mærsk, purchased Kattrup in 1949. After his death, Kattrup went to his daughter Sally Mc-Kinney Møller.

Architecture
The Neoclassical main building is from 1925 and was designed byJens Ingwersen. It is a white-washed building with two corner risalits. The roof is a hipped red tile roof.

The building is located on the south side of a large courtyard.  The courtyard is flanked by older farm buildings from the 19th century. To the south of the main building is a large park with three pends.

Today
The estate is today owned by Peter Anders Møller. It covers 1,023 hectares. Komtesseboligen is rented out for meetings, exhibitions and other events.

List of owners
 ( -1393) The Crown
 (1393-1444) ]]Sorø Abbey]] 
 (1444-1536) Bishopric of Roskilde 
 (1536-1561) The Crown
 (1561- ) Laurids Iversen Serlin 
 ( - ) Christoffer Lauridsen Serlin 
 ( -1602) Rasmus Skade 
 (1602-1654) Christoffer Skade 
 (1654-1655) Boet efter Christoffer Skade 
 (1655-1664) Axel Juul 
 (1664- ) Henrik Müller 
 ( -1689) Christian Müller 
 (1689-1704) Frantz Müller 
 (1704- ) Christian Paludan 
 ( -1718) Bolle Luxdorph Rose 
 (1718- ) Hans Philip Bockenhoffer 
 ( -1742) Mette Marie Juul 
 (1742-1751) Anton Günther v. Ellbrecht 
 (1751- ) Peder Kraft 
 ( -1765) Enke efter Peder Kraft 
 (1765-1775) Jørgen v. Hjelmcrone 
 (1775-1781) H. Focken 
 (1781-1793) P. Gommesen Errebo 
 (1793-1800) Peder Ole Borch Møller 
 (1800-1804) Johan Caspar Mylius 
 (1804-1831) Ulrika Catharina Rasch, gift Mylius 
 (1831-1835) Johan Caspar Mylius 
 (1835-1836) J.F. Adeler 
 (1836-1852) Johan Caspar Mylius 
 (1852-1894) Frederik Bernstorff 
 (1894-1925) Ulrich Bernstorff-Mylius 
 (1925-1949) Andreas Peter Bernstorff-Mylius 
 (1949-1965) Arnold Peter Møller 
 (1965-1972) Sally McKinney-Møller 
 (1972-2007) Peter Arnold Poul Møller 
 (2007- ) Peter Anders Møller

References

External links
 Official website
 Aerial of the buildings
Buildings and structures associated with the Bernstorff family
Manor houses in Kalundborg Municipality
Houses completed in 1925
Buildings and structures associated with the Mylius family